Itis may refer to:

Healthcare
 Inflammation
 Postprandial somnolence (colloquially "the itis"), a state of drowsiness or lassitude following a meal

Information systems
 Integrated Taxonomic Information System, a partnership designed to provide consistent and reliable information on the taxonomy of biological species
 Integrated Transport Information System,  a traffic management system in Klang Valley, Malaysia

Other uses
 Itis shopping centre, a shopping centre in the district of Itäkeskus in East Helsinki, Finland
 "The Itis" (The Boondocks), the tenth episode of the Adult Swim animated television series, The Boondocks